Jean-Baptiste-Claude Séne (1747-1803) was a French furniture maker in the 18th century, primarily during the reign of Louis XVI.  He came from a noted family of menuisiers, or furniture craftsmen. cabinet makers.  His grandfather Jean established a workshop, which was inherited by his father Claude I (1724-1792), who earned the title of a master craftsman in 1743, and made chairs and armchairs  for Louis XV.  Jean-Baptiste-CLaude became a master in 1769.  His younger brother, Claude II (called Sené the younger), also became a master in  1769, and both made chairs for Louis XVI.

In 1785b Jean-Baptiste-Claude received the title of fournissur  to the royal furniture depot, and made chairs, armchairs, stools, fireplace screens and beds for the Palace of Versailles. the Palace of Fontainebleau, and the Palace of Saint-Cloud. His works were prominent in the private apartments of Marie-Antoinette.

Notes and Citations

See also
Louis XVI furniture
Louis XVI style

Bibliography

French furniture makers
History of furniture
Louis XVI
Court of Louis XVI